Qarah Tappeh (also Romanized as Qareh Tappeh) is a village in Dursun Khvajeh Rural District, in the Central District of Nir County, Ardabil Province, Iran. At the 2006 census, its population was 88, in 26 families.

References 

Towns and villages in Nir County